John Rakowski (born 16 March 1948) is an Australian boxer. He competed in the men's bantamweight event at the 1968 Summer Olympics.

References

External links
 

1948 births
Living people
Australian male boxers
Olympic boxers of Australia
Boxers at the 1968 Summer Olympics
Boxers from Brisbane
Commonwealth Games medallists in boxing
Commonwealth Games bronze medallists for Australia
Boxers at the 1966 British Empire and Commonwealth Games
Bantamweight boxers
Medallists at the 1966 British Empire and Commonwealth Games